The Coolpix L3 is a discontinued compact point-and-shoot digital camera produced by Nikon. It was branded as part of the "Life" or "L-series" cameras in the Coolpix family. It had a 5.1 megapixel maximum resolution, 2" TFT LCD monitor, 3x Optical Zoom, D-Lighting, and Face-priority AF.

References

External links
 
 Imaging - Coolpix L3
 Nikon Coolpix L3: Digital Photography Review

L003
Live-preview digital cameras